William Jones (born 1925, died 7 August 2014, in Florida) was a Uruguayan rower who competed in the 1948 Summer Olympics.

In 1948 he won the bronze medal with his partner Juan Rodríguez in the double sculls event. He died in his sleep at his residence in Inverness, Florida, at the age of 89 on 7 August 2014.

References

Uruguayan people of British descent
Uruguayan male rowers
Olympic rowers of Uruguay
Rowers at the 1948 Summer Olympics
Olympic bronze medalists for Uruguay
Olympic medalists in rowing
Medalists at the 1948 Summer Olympics
1925 births
2014 deaths
20th-century Uruguayan people